Mansion in Grzybów is a Mansion located in Rabieżyce, the southern part of the Grzybowo village, in Wielkopolska province. It is located at a distance of 7 km from the Wrzesnia. Within a short walk from the mansion is a historic park with an area of 0.9 hectares.

Gallery

Sources 
 

Manor houses in Poland
Września County